Valley View School District is a public school district based in the southwest side of Jonesboro, Arkansas, United States. The Valley View School District provides early childhood, elementary and secondary education for more than 2,500 students in the Jonesboro, Arkansas area.

Valley View School District is accredited by the Arkansas Department of Education (ADE).

Schools 

Source: Arkansas Department of Information

In The News 

 The school district attracted significant controversy in early 2021 when two elementary physical education teachers, Nancy Best and Cindi Talbot, participated in the 2021 storming of the United States Capitol. In public statements, Superintendent Bryan Russell defended the teachers.

References

External links 

 

School districts in Arkansas
Education in Craighead County, Arkansas
1925 establishments in Arkansas
Jonesboro, Arkansas
School districts established in 1925